William Jay may refer to:

William Jay (minister) (1769–1853), English nonconformist minister
William Jay (architect) (1792–1837), English architect who also worked in America, son of the minister
William Jay (jurist) (1789–1858), American reformer, jurist, and the son of Founding Father and first U.S. Supreme Court Chief Justice John Jay (1745–1829)
William Jay (Colonel) (died 1915), colonel in the US Army and vice president of the New York Herald